Denitrificimonas caeni is a genus of pseudomonad bacteria.

References

Pseudomonadales
Bacteria genera